The Sub-district I of Śródmieście (of Armia Krajowa) (Polish: Obwód II Śródmieście also named as Obwód Radwan) - a territorial organisational unit of the District of Warsaw of Armia Krajowa. It covered the area of Śródmieście in Warsaw, fought in conspiracy during the German occupation of Poland during World War II and openly during the Warsaw Uprising 1944.

Sub-district commander was Edward Pfeiffer, codenamed Radwan.

See also
 Military description of the Warsaw Uprising

References
 Struktura Organizacyjna Armii Krajowej, Marek Ney-Krwawicz w: Mówią wieki nr 9/1986.

Units and formations of the Home Army
Warsaw Uprising